The 1999 Giro di Lombardia was the 93rd edition of the Giro di Lombardia cycle race and was held on 16 October 1999. The race started in Varese and finished in Bergamo. The race was won by Mirko Celestino of the Polti team.

General classification

References

1999
Giro di Lombardia
Giro di Lombardia
Giro Di Lombardia
October 1999 sports events in Europe